2LO was the second radio station to regularly broadcast in the United Kingdom (the first was 2MT). It began broadcasting on 11 May 1922, for one hour a day from the seventh floor of Marconi House in London's Strand, opposite Somerset House.

History
Initially the power was 100 watts on 350 metres (857 kHz). 2LO was allowed to transmit for seven minutes, after which the "operator" had to listen on the wavelength for three minutes for possible instructions to close down. On 14 November 1922 the station was transferred to the new British Broadcasting Company which in 1923 took up the nearby Savoy Hill for its broadcasting studios. At midnight on New Year's Eve 1923, the twelve chimes of Big Ben were broadcast for the first time to mark the new year.

In 1927 the company became the British Broadcasting Corporation. On 9 March 1930 2LO was replaced by the BBC Regional Programme and the BBC National Programme. The letters LO continued to be used internally as a designation in the BBC for technical operations in the London area (for example, the numbering of all recordings made in London contained LO). The code LO was changed to LN in the early 1970s.

Preservation and legacy

The 2LO transmitter now belongs to the Science Museum, having been donated by Crown Castle International on 7 November 2002.  It is displayed in the Information Age gallery on the second floor of the museum.

Marconi House was demolished in 2006, apart from the listed façade, which will be incorporated into a new hotel complex.  A first-hand account of a broadcast from 2LO is given in The Spell of London by H. V. Morton.

The 'LO' part of 2LO's callsign was adopted in 1924 by the metropolitan radio station in Melbourne which, since 1932, has been a part of the Australian Broadcasting Corporation. The station, 3LO, still has this callsign allocated to it, but since 2000 it has used different on-air names, first 774 ABC Melbourne and since 2017, Radio Melbourne.  The amateur radio callsign G2LO is currently held by the staff association at Arqiva, formerly Crown Castle International, formerly the domestic part of BBC Transmitter Department.

In fiction
2LO is briefly mentioned in the 1928, Lord Peter Wimsey, detective short-story The Entertaining Episode of the Article in Question by Dorothy L. Sayers.

References

Sources
H.V. Morton. 1926, 18th Edition 1948, The spell of London, Methuen & Co Ltd, London.

External links
 The Science Museum: London Calling 
 History of Marconi House where 2LO first broadcast
 Audio of 2LO station identification

Radio stations in London
Radio stations established in 1922
Radio stations disestablished in 1930
Defunct radio stations in the United Kingdom